Haver is a German, Dutch and English surname. In Germany or England it refers to oats and is used as an occupational surname for a grower or seller of oats. In the Netherlands it is an occupational surname for a wood or stone cutter. 
The surname may refer to the following notable people:

 June Haver (1926–2005), American actress
 Phyllis Haver (1899–1960), American actress
 Ralph Haver (20th century), American architect
 Shaye Lynne Haver (21st century), American soldier

See also
 O'Haver

References

German-language surnames
English-language surnames
Dutch-language surnames